The 2020 Pacific Challenge was the fifteenth World Rugby Pacific Challenge. Teams from Japan, Fiji, Samoa and Tonga featured in the competition which was played in Fiji as a round-robin tournament. Junior Japan went undefeated in winning the challenge title, with the Fiji Warriors finishing as runner-up. The Japanese defeated the Fijian team by 21–12 in the last round.

Teams
The four teams that competed were:

 
 Fiji Warriors

Table

Match results

Round 1

Round 2

Round 3

References

2020
2020 in Oceanian rugby union
2019–20 in Japanese rugby union
2020 in Fijian rugby union
2020 in Samoan rugby union
2020 in Tongan rugby union
2020 rugby union tournaments for national teams
March 2020 sports events in Oceania
International rugby union competitions hosted by Fiji